Abū 'l-Yaqẓān ʿAmmār ibn Yāsir ibn ʿĀmir ibn Mālik al-ʿAnsīy al-Maḏḥiǧī also known as Abū 'l-Yaqẓān ʿAmmār ibn Sumayya was one of the Muhajirun in the history of Islam and, for his dedicated devotion to Islam's cause, is considered to be one of the closest and most loyal companions of Muhammad and to Muslims; thus, he occupies a position of the highest prominence in Islam.

Belonging to the Banu Makhzum tribe, Ammar was born in the year 567 to Yasir ibn Amir and Sumayyah bint Khayyat, both of whom were brutally killed. At an early age, Ammar converted to Islam by the invitation of Abu Bakr, becoming one of the earliest Muslims. He became one of the most prominent companions of Muhammad by participated in all of his military conflicts and battles. Historically, Ammar ibn Yasir was the first Muslim to build a mosque. 

After the death of Muhammad, Ammar remained loyal to Ali and is referred to by Shia Muslims as one of the Four Companions. Muslims consider Ammar's ultimate fate to be unique among the fates of Muhammad's companions, for they perceive his death at the Battle of Siffin as the decisive distinguisher between the righteous group and the sinful one in the First Fitna.

Before Islam 
ʿAmmār belonged to Banu Makhzum tribe in Hijaz (current-day Saudi Arabia). He was born in the Year of the Elephant, which was the same year as Muhammad's birth, in Mecca and was one of the intermediaries in Muhammad's marriage to Khadijah bint Khuwaylid. His father, Yasir ibn Amir, was from the tribe of Qahtan in Yemen and migrated to Mecca and settled down there after marrying Sumayyah bint Khayyat, a slave woman; Ammar and his parents, Yasir and Sumayyah, were slaves to Abu Huzaifa, but upon his death, Abu Jahl -who became later one of Islam's most brutal enemies and the infamous torturer of Ammar and his parents- took them over as his slaves. Ammar's trust in and knowledge of Muhammad's credibility, even before his prophethood, encouraged him to follow Muhammad's prophetic visions as one of the earliest converts.

After conversion to Islam 
ʿAmmār converted to Islam in 614 or 615 CE . This coincided with the period when the Quraysh were persecuting the lower-class Muslims. As Ammar later told his grandson: "I met Suhayb ibn Sinan at the door of the house of Al-Arqam while the Messenger of Allah was in it. I asked him, 'What do you want?' He said to me, 'What do you want?' I answered, 'I want to go to Muhammad and listen to what he says.' He said, 'That is what I want.' We entered and he presented Islam to us and we became Muslim. Then we spent the day until evening and went out concealing ourselves". Ammar's father, mother and brother also became Muslims, though not at Abu Bakr's invitation.

When Quraysh knew of the conversion of Yasir's family to Islam, they were among the "victims who were tortured at Macca to make them recant". The Makhzum clan used to take out Ammar ibn Yasir with his father and mother in the heat of the day and expose them to the excessively-hot environment of Mecca and torture them in the scorches of the open fire, and Muhammad used to pass by them and say, "Patience, O family of Yasir! Your meeting-place will be Paradise" and "O fire! Be cool and harmless for ‘Ammar in the same manner in which you became cool and harmless for Ibrahim;” consequently, Ammar had scars on his body from the torture for the rest of his life.

Ammar was tortured "until he did not know what he was saying," as was his friend Suhayb; in that state, he eventually maligned Muhammad and spoke well of the pagan gods. Afterwards he went to Muhammad and confessed his recantation. Muhammad asked, "How do you find your heart?" When Ammar replied that he was still a Muslim in his heart, Muhammad said all was well. A verse of the Qur'an, "someone forced to do it whose heart remains at rest in its faith" (16:106), refers to Ammar. Ammar's mother was murdered by Abu Jahl for her refusal to abandon Islam: she is considered the first Muslim martyr. The opening verses of Surat Al-Ankabut (chapter 29: The Spider) were revealed in response to this tragic event.

To escape the torture of the Meccans at the time, it is reported by ibn Saad and Ibn Ishaq that Ammar went to Abyssinia in 616.

Battles under Muhammad 

'Ammar was one of the few warriors who participated in the first major battle in Islam, the Battle of Badr, despite the extraordinary harsh conditions at the time; dedicatedly, he continued to take part in all the arduous battles with the Muslims even after prophet Muhammad's death.

Besides his major involvement in Islam's military campaigns, this incident in Muhammad's life proved to be of most importance -historically- to Muslims: while ʻAmmār was participating in building The Prophet's Mosque in Medina, (quoting a hadith) "[and he] came in when they had overloaded him with bricks saying, 'They are killing me. They load me with burdens they can't carry themselves.' Umm Salama the prophet's wife said: I saw the apostle run his hand through is hair--for he was a curly-haired man--and say 'Alas Ibn Sumayya! It is not they who will kill you but a wicked band of men.'...Now he had a stick in his hand and the apostle was angry and said, 'What is wrong between them and ʻAmmār? He invites them to Paradise while they invite him to hell.'" These reports, viewed as valid by both Sunnis and Shi'is, would later be important during the issue of succession and particularly in interpreting ʻAmmār's death in the Battle of Siffin.

Role after Muhammad's death

Under ʻUmar, he became governor of Kufa, however he was later removed from power. 

During Uthman ibn Affan's election by the shura and before his eventual overthrowal, Ammar warningly predicted the upcoming conflict if anyone but Ali got elected and said that "If you do not want to cause a dispute among the Muslims, you have to give the pledge of allegiance to Ali". Ammar's relationship with Uthman ibn Affan deteriorated; although the details of their hostilities towards each other are debatable.

Battle of the Camel

Prior to the events of the Battle of the Camel, a shura was set up in an attempt to decide a successor after ʿUthmān's death; at this meeting, attendees were not in agreement regarding whether retaliation for ʿUthmān's murder was necessary or not. A report of ʻAlqama b. Waqqas al-Laythi of Kinana indicates that ʻAmmār said that they should not seek revenge. Madelung interprets ʻAmmār's behavior at this meeting indicating his desire to keep Talha from gaining power because Talha was in favor of seeking retaliation. ʻAmmār would not have wanted this since "he had been the most active in inciting the rebels to action".

As the battle was developing, ʻAmmār continued to show his support for ʿAlī in multiple ways. ʿAlī first sent him along with al-Hasan to Kufa in order to try to rally the Kufans to help during the upcoming battle. According to one report recorded by al-Tabari, ʻAmmār was questioned upon arrival for participating in ʿUthmān's murder; however, he continued to try to convince the governor, Abu Musa, to take a stance instead of remaining impartial in the conflict. Al-Tabari reports how Abu Musa had encouraged the Kufans to remain neutral because he did not want to participate in inter-Muslim fighting, and he also believed that the Muslim community still owed their allegiance to ʿUthmān because no new successor had been named. An additional transmission of the same event does not mention ʻAmmār's actions against ʿUthmān and instead focuses on his intentions to sway Abu Musa into action. 
During the actual battle, ʻAmmār fought on ʿAlī's side. Al-Tabari includes in his history an account in which al-Zubayr is told that ʻAmmār is fighting alongside ʿAlī, and this knowledge causes al-Zubayr to be fearful because he had been with Muhammad and ʻAmmār when Muhammad had told ʻAmmār that he would be killed by "a wicked band of men". Al-Tabari again includes multiple reports of the same event, which in this case is a moment during the battle in which ʻAmmār and al-Zubayr confront each other. In both accounts ʻAmmār approaches al-Zubayr to attack him, when al-Zubayr speaks. In the report from 'Umar b. Shabbah, al-Zubayr asks ʻAmmār, "Do you want to kill me?" whereas in that from 'Amir b. Hafs, al-Zubayr asks, "Are you going to kill me, Abu al Yaqzan?" In both reports, ʻAmmār's response is negative. At the end of the battle, which is successful for ʿAlī's side, ʿAlī orders ʻAmmār and Muhammad ibn Abi Bakr to remove Aisha from her camel and bring her to 'Abdallah ibn Khalaf al-Khuza I's home in Basrah; because Al-Tabari repeatedly cites multiple reports from different transmitters, such variations in the consistency of the incidents' details -at that time- renders the reported nature of the consequential meeting of ʻAmmār and ʻA'ishah unclear: for one account displays ʻA'ishah as hostile towards ʻAmmār, whereas another later report describes the two as being on more amicable terms.

Martyrdom in the Battle of Siffin

While strategising about how to defeat Muawiyah I's forces, ʿAlī gathered together a group of the Islamic ruling elite that included ʻAmmār, Hashim ibn Utbah, and Qays ibn Sa'd who, collectively, encouraged ʿAlī to wage jihad preemptively against whom they considered to be in the wrong. Malik Al-Ashtar also shared this opinion (albeit in a different incident). Later in the battle, ʻAmmār's name was brought up during an attempt to negotiate a truce between ʿAlī, represented by Shabath ibn Rib'i, and Muʿāwiya. Shabath is reported to have asked Muʿāwiya, "Would it make you happy, O Muʿāwiya, if you were given power over ʻAmmār, to kill him?" Muʿāwiya's response was, "Why should I not? But, by God, if I were given power over Ibn Sumayya, I would not kill him in revenge for ʿUthmān [only] but for Natil the mawla of ʿUthmān". Shabath's response was defensive and protective of ʻAmmār. In the Battle at Siffin in Al-Sham, ʿAlī placed ʻAmmār in charge of the Kufan infantry, and on the third day of fighting he tries to inspire his forces to victory by reminding them of the impiety of Muʿāwiya and his troops. Eventually, ʻAmmār was martyred in the battle by the forces of Muʿāwiya ibn Abī Sufyān in 657.

Hanzala bin Khawalid narrated:

I was sitting with Muawiya. Two people were fighting over the head of Ammar bin Yassar. Each one of them was claiming that “I killed Ammar.” Then Abdullah bin Amr said “Each one of you is getting happy over the killing of this person, surely I heard from the Prophet saying this, Oh Ammar the rebellious group will martyr you.” 

Narrated `Ikrima: that Ibn `Abbas told him and `Ali bin `Abdullah to go to Abu Sa`id and listen to some of his narrations; So they both went (and saw) Abu Sa`id and his brother irrigating a garden belonging to them. When he saw them, he came up to them and sat down with his legs drawn up and wrapped in his garment and said, (During the construction of the mosque of the Prophet) we carried the adobe of the mosque, one brick at a time while `Ammar used to carry two at a time. The Prophet passed by `Ammar and removed the dust off his head and said, May Allah be merciful to `Ammar. He will be killed by a rebellious aggressive group. `Ammar will invite them to (obey) Allah and they will invite him to the (Hell) fire. (Sahih Bukhari Hadith No. 2812)

While reports vary as to Ammar's exact age, most place him at ninety years or older. Madelung puts him at over 90 years old; whereas Hasson states he was somewhere between 90 and 94. According to one report Tabari provides, ʻAbdallah b. Amr questions his father, ʻAmr b.al-As, about killing ʻAmmār. ʻAbdallah references the hadith in which Muhammad tells ʻAmmār that the "usurping party" will kill him. ʻAmr brings this concern to Muʿāwiya whose response is "Was it we who killed ʻAmmār? It was only those who brought him here". Ali ibn Abi Talib is said to have responded that if he killed Ammar then Muhammad is the one who killed Hamza ibn Abdul-Muttalib.

Legacy

Muhammad willed 'Ammar ibn Yasir as one of the four Sahabas whose guidance should be heeded by Muslims and also being those promised paradise.

When Ammar 'died, Muʿāwiya referred to him as "one of ʿAlī's two right hands" with the other being Malik al-Ashtar. Madelung quotes Al-Tabari by reporting what Muʿāwiya said to his followers after killing Imam Ali's other loyal companion, Malik al-Ashtar: "Ali b. Abi Talib had two right hands. One of them was cut at Siffin', meaning ʻAmmār b. Yasir, 'and the other today', meaning al-Ashtar". Despite Muʿāwiya's provocations, ʻAli ibn Abi Talib, the Caliph at the time, highly valued the support of 'Ammar ibn Yasir and Malik al-Ashtar nonetheless. ʻAli mourned 'Ammar's loss deeply.

ʿAmmār's shrine, prior to its destruction, was frequently visited and paid tribute to by Muslims.

Former Palestinian leader, Yasser Arafat, was nicknamed "Abu Ammar" after Ammar ibn Yasser.

Shrine desecration

The destruction of ʿAmmār's shrine was condemned by Muslims and sparked outrage in various parts of the Muslim world.

See also
 List of Sahabah
 Shia view of Sahaba
 List of expeditions of Muhammad
 Uwais al-Qarani
 First Fitna

References

External links
 Biography of Ammar bin Yasir

570 births
657 deaths
6th-century Arabs
Arabian slaves and freedmen
Sahabah who participated in the battle of Uhud
Sahabah who participated in the battle of Badr
Muhajirun
People of the First Fitna
Rashidun governors of Kufa
Sahabah killed in battle